Johnson Township is a township in Carter County, in the U.S. state of Missouri.

Johnson Township was established in 1873, taking its name from President Andrew Johnson.

References

Townships in Missouri
Townships in Carter County, Missouri